Fritz Eberhard Werner (8 August 1924 – 23 September 2002) was a German artist and landscapist.

Life
Eberhard Werner was born in Glogau/Schlesien, the son of Friedrich Werner, a newspaper publisher and printer. After his battlefield injury that stemmed from the World War II was cured, he became a teacher in the GDR in Gransee and studied Art in Erfurt.

Although he was quite successful as an artist, he left the GDR in 1959 due to political-artistic restrictions. Werner was reluctant to accept the commercialization of art.

He died in Lübbecke.

Gallery of selected works

References

External links
Artist Eberhard Werner
Eberhard Werner's online gallery
Eberhard Werner: Art in public I
Eberhard Werner: Art in public II

German artists
People from Głogów
People from the Province of Silesia
1924 births
2002 deaths
German military personnel of World War II